Herina palustris is a species of picture-winged fly in the genus Herina of the family Ulidiidae.

References

Ulidiidae
Insects described in 1826
Diptera of Europe